On Wings is the debut single by Leanne Moore, winner of the Irish talent competition You're A Star. The single debuted at number one on the Irish Singles Chart for the week ending 26 June 2008.

Background 
The song was written in memory of two 15-year-old stepsisters Robyn O Riordan and Leanne Miller who died in a car accident. The song was written by their cousin Jamie Bridgeman. The song's success is largely because it is for charity It is hoped that the song will be able to encourage young people to drive with caution as the medium of music seemed the best way to get the message across . The song was funded by the Gardaí and was support by the road safety authority.

References

2008 singles
Irish Singles Chart number-one singles